Cruel Sister may refer to:

Cruel Sister (Pentangle album)
Cruel Sister (Rachel Unthank and the Winterset album)
Cruel Sister (Wolfe), a 2004 composition for string orchestra by Julia Wolfe
"The Cruel Sister" or "The Twa Sisters”, a Northumbrian murder ballad